Saint Margaret's College, Otago is a residential college affiliated to the University of Otago in Dunedin, New Zealand. The current Master (Head of the College) is Elizabeth Koni and the Dean of Students is Jill Spencer. The previous Master, Dr Charles Tustin, retired in January 2023. His predecessor, Dr Peter Norris, retired in November 2016 after 28 years of service to the College.

The college celebrated its 2011 centenary, with a college history published in 2010 and a weekend of celebrations in January, 2011.

The College currently accommodates 224 students. Its motto is "altiora in votis" or "set your heart on higher things".

History 
The college was founded in 1911 as the University's third college and was the first to be designated specifically as a women's college anywhere in Oceania. Otago University was the first university in New Zealand - or anywhere in the British Empire - to allow women to attend all lectures. As a result, it had a high proportion of female students. By 1909 between a quarter and a third of Otago university's students were women. Originally located in the former Presbyterian manse in Leith Street, St Margaret's moved to its present site in 1915 following construction of the building in 1914. New wings were added in 1946 and 1967.

St Margaret's was the first women's college in Dunedin to accept male students, which it did for the first time in 1981.

In early 2006 the college kitchen and dining hall were renovated and repainted. In early 2007, the entrance hall was renovated, with the addition of leather couches.

In summer 2007/8 a new floor was added to Clyde Wing.

In 2008 the ground floor of the main wing was refurbished with rooms getting new wallpaper and carpet and more light fittings amongst other things.

Notable residents 
Ann Wylie (resident 1941–44)

References

External links
Saint Margaret's College - official site

University residences in New Zealand
Buildings and structures of the University of Otago
1910s architecture in New Zealand